Stars of Eger (Hungarian:Egri csillagok) is a 1968 Hungarian-Bulgarian historical film directed by Zoltán Várkonyi and starring Imre Sinkovits, György Bárdy and István Kovács. It is an adaptation of the 1899 novel Eclipse of the Crescent Moon by Géza Gárdonyi. An earlier silent film adaptation, Stars of Eger, was made in 1923. "Stars of Eger" is a direct translation of the original Hungarian title of the novel.

Partial cast
 Imre Sinkovits - István Dobó
 György Bárdy - Jumurdzsák
 István Kovács - Gergely Bornemissza
 Tibor Bitskey - Mekcsey István
 Gábor Agárdy - Sárközy
 Vera Venczel - Éva Cecey
 Éva Ruttkai - Queen Isabella Jagiellon
 Hilda Gobbi - Baloghné
 Vera Szemere - Ceceyné
 Péter Benkő - János Török
 Rudolf Somogyvári - István Hegedûs
 Gyula Benkő - Veli bég
 László Tahi Tóth - Kobzos Ádám
 Géza Tordy - Miklós
 Tamás Major - Sultan Suleiman the Magnificent
 Miklós Szakáts - Beylerbey
 Gábor Mádi Szabó - Cecey
 Zoltán Latinovits - Imre Varsányi
 Gábor Koncz - János
 Samu Balázs - Pope Julius III
 Géza Polgár - Bojki Tamás
 Antal Farkas - Debrõi, innkeeper
 József Fonyó - Emperor Ferdinand's interpreter
 László György - Woodsmith
 József Horváth - Sukán
 László Inke - Kara Ahmed Pasha
 László Márkus - Turkish Lord
 György Korga - Bornemissza Jancsika
 Tibor Molnár - Friar Márton
 Lajos Pándy - Fügedy
 János Rajz - Friar
 Levente Sipeki - Fürjes Ádám
 Nándor Tomanek - Preacher
 István Velenczei - Father György
 Endre Szász - Painter
 Ferenc Zenthe - Josef, the German mercenary
 László Bánhidi - Jumurdzsák's prisoner
 Ferenc Bessenyei - Bálint Török
 Péter Blaskó - Hungarian soldier
 András Kern - Cook
 István Bujtor - Blacksmith
 László György - Blacksmith
 Teri Horváth - Egri woman
 Ildikó Pécsi - Egri woman
 Nóra Tábori - Egri woman
 Zoltán Várkonyi - Emperor Ferdinand I
 Gábor Harsányi
 Sándor Kömíves
 Hédi Temessy

External links

1968 films
1960s adventure drama films
1960s historical films
Hungarian drama films
Bulgarian drama films
1960s Hungarian-language films
Films based on Hungarian novels
Films directed by Zoltán Várkonyi
Epic films based on actual events
War adventure films
Historical epic films
1968 drama films